Marko Novaković (born 4 January 1989) is a Serbian sprint canoer.

He won a gold medal in the K-1 200 m event at the 2012 Canoe Sprint European Championships in Zagreb, and the K-2 200 m in 2016.  He also won silver in that event in 2015.  He won the gold medal in the K-2 200 m at the 2014 World Championships, and bronze in that event at the 2015 World Championships.

He is currently coached by former Serbian canoer Jozef Soti.

References

External links

1989 births
Living people
People from Bečej
Serbian male canoeists
Olympic canoeists of Serbia
Canoeists at the 2012 Summer Olympics
Canoeists at the 2016 Summer Olympics
European Games medalists in canoeing
European Games gold medalists for Serbia
Canoeists at the 2015 European Games
European champions for Serbia
ICF Canoe Sprint World Championships medalists in kayak